Colin Charles Greenwood (born 26 June 1969) is an English musician and the bassist for the rock band Radiohead. Along with bass guitar, Greenwood plays upright bass and electronic instruments.

With his younger brother, the Radiohead guitarist Jonny Greenwood, Greenwood attended Abingdon School in Abingdon, England, where he met the future band members. Radiohead have achieved critical acclaim and have sold more than 30 million albums. In 2019, Greenwood and the other members of Radiohead were inducted into the Rock and Roll Hall of Fame.

Early life
Colin Greenwood is the older brother of the Radiohead guitarist Jonny Greenwood. Their father served in the British Army as a bomb disposal expert. The Greenwood family has historical ties to the British Communist Party and the socialist Fabian Society.
Greenwood lived in Germany as a child and became fluent in German. Greenwood credited his older sister, Susan, with influencing his and Jonny's taste in music as adolescents: "She's responsible for our precocious love of miserable music. The Fall, Magazine, Joy Division. We were ostracised at school because everyone else was into Iron Maiden."

When Greenwood was 12, he met the future Radiohead singer Thom Yorke at Abingdon School, a private school for boys in Oxfordshire. Their future bandmates Ed O'Brien, whom Greenwood met during a school production of the opera Trial by Jury, and Philip Selway also attended the school.

Greenwood bought his first guitar when he was 15. He studied classical guitar under the Abingdon music teacher Terence Gilmore-James, who introduced him and the other future members of Radiohead to jazz, film scores, postwar avant-garde music, and 20th-century classical music. Greenwood said: "When we started, it was very important that we got support from him, because we weren't getting any from the headmaster. You know, the man once sent us a bill, charging us for the use of school property, because we practiced in one of the music rooms on a Sunday."

According to Greenwood, he began playing bass out of necessity, teaching himself by playing along to New Order, Joy Division and Otis Redding. Among his musical influences are Booker T and the MGs, Bill Withers and Curtis Mayfield. He said: "We were people who picked up their respective instruments because we wanted to play music together, rather than just because we wanted to play that particular instrument. So it was more of a collective angle, and if you could contribute by having someone else play your instrument, then that was really cool."

Greenwood read English at Peterhouse, Cambridge, between 1987 and 1990, and read modern American literature including Raymond Carver, John Cheever and other postwar American writers. While at Peterhouse, he worked as an events and entertainments officer. After graduating, he took a job as a sales assistant at the record shop Our Price in Oxford.

Radiohead

In late 1991, the EMI sales representative Keith Wozencroft visited Our Price and struck up conversation with Greenwood. When Wozencroft mentioned that he was moving to a position as an A&R scout at the EMI subsidiary Parlophone, Greenwood gave him a copy of On a Friday's latest demo.

On a Friday signed a six-album recording contract with EMI and changed their name to Radiohead. By 2011, Radiohead had sold more than 30 million albums worldwide. They were inducted into the Rock and Roll Hall of Fame in March 2019. On being in a band with his younger brother Jonny, Colin said: "Beyond the normal brotherly thing, I respect him as a person and a musician."

Other work
In 1997, Greenwood participated in a marketing campaign for his alma mater Cambridge University, posing for a photo with students from both state and private schools for a poster titled "Put Yourself in the Picture". The poster was "designed to break down some of the stereotypes that deter able students from applying to Cambridge" and encourage more applicants from state schools.

Greenwood contributed bass to Jonny Greenwood's debut solo work Bodysong (2003), the score for the 2008 film Woodpecker. He played bass on the 2018 album Amir by the Belgian-Egyptian singer Tamino, and on the album World's Strongest Man (2018) by Gaz Coombes. He also played bass on "Brasil" from Earth (2020), the debut solo album by his Radiohead bandmate Ed O'Brien. He contributed beat programming to Thom Yorke's song "Hearing Damage" from the soundtrack to The Twilight Saga: New Moon, and on a track from Yorke's album Tomorrow's Modern Boxes (2014).

In 2004, Greenwood participated on a panel in the annual sixth-form conference run by Radley College in collaboration with School of St Helen and St Katharine, speaking on digital-rights management (DRM) from. In 2013, Greenwood soundtracked a Dries van Noten runway show, performing solo bass guitar. In 2018, he reviewed Michael Palin's book Erebus: The Story of a Ship for the Spectator. In late 2022, he toured Australia as part of Nick Cave and Warren Ellis's band.

Musicianship 
Greenwood mostly plays fingerstyle, and described himself as "rubbish" with plectrums. He mainly uses Fender basses and Ampeg and Ashdown amplifiers. He also plays double bass and synthesisers. He said: "My involvement is to play bass guitar, but our ideas and suggestions in certain areas, as to where the music should go or develop, are listened to. We are very much a band." In another interview, he said he did not think of himself as a bass player and was "just in a band with other people".

Personal life
Greenwood enjoys writers such as Thomas Pynchon, V.S. Naipaul and Delmore Schwartz. In December 1998, he married Molly McGrann, an American literary critic and novelist. They have three sons, Jesse, born in December 2003, Asa, born in December 2005, and Henry, born in December 2009. They live in Oxford.

Greenwood is an amateur photographer. In 2003, he discussed his favourite photographs in the Victoria and Albert Museum, choosing images by Frederick Sommer and Harold Edgerton among others.

See also
 List of Old Abingdonians

References

External links
 Talk in Maths: Fansite
 How to Be Like Colin Greenwood – In Ten Easy Steps
 Colin Greenwood News

1969 births
English rock bass guitarists
Male bass guitarists
Grammy Award winners
Ivor Novello Award winners
Living people
Musicians from Oxford
Radiohead members
Alumni of Peterhouse, Cambridge
People educated at Abingdon School
Alternative rock bass guitarists